David Thomas Syers (born 30 November 1987) is an English professional footballer who plays as a midfielder for  club Farsley Celtic.

After playing youth football with Darlington, Syers played non-league football for Ossett Albion, Harrogate Town, Farsley Celtic and Guiseley while studying at University, before turning professional in 2010 with Bradford City. After spending two seasons with them, he moved to Doncaster Rovers in 2012. While at Doncaster he spent a loan spell with Scunthorpe United, before signing a permanent deal with the club in January 2014. After a period out with injury he moved to Rochdale in January 2016, returned to Guiseley in August, and rejoined Darlington in October, where he spent two years before signing for Farsley Celtic.

Early and personal life
Born in Leeds, Syers attended Leeds Grammar School, representing the school at cricket.

He attended the University of Leeds, where he read classics, and represented the English Universities football team during the 2008–09 season.

He began training as an accountant after signing for Darlington in October 2016.

Dave married his girlfriend Hannah Bickers in June 2013. In October 2016 he was living near Wetherby.

Football career

Non-league career
Syers played for Darlington between the ages of 14 and 16. He started his career with Ossett Albion while still at school. After playing more than 150 games with Ossett, he moved to Harrogate Town in April 2009. After making three appearances for Harrogate, Syers moved to Farsley Celtic in June 2009. During that season Syers scored nine league goals for Farsley. After a second spell with Ossett Albion in the latter stages of the 2009–2010 season, Syers returned to Harrogate in March 2010. Syers joined Guiseley on 1 July 2010.

Bradford City
Syers went on trial to League Two side Bradford City on 15 July 2010. He signed on non-contract terms with Bradford on 10 August 2010, before making his professional debut for them that same day, in a 2–1 League Cup victory over Nottingham Forest, in which Syers scored the first goal to take the game into extra time. By the end of the week, Syers signed a full-time contract with City for the rest of the season after impressing manager Peter Taylor. A day later, Syers made his Football League debut, coming on as a second-half substitute for Tommy Doherty in 1–0 victory over Stevenage. In March 2011, Syers' contract was automatically extended by Bradford until the end of the 2011–12 season, following the activation of a clause in his contract regarding match appearances. Following his first season in professional football, Syers was awarded Bradford City's Player's Player of the Year award by his teammates in May 2011. The full Player of the Year award had been cancelled two weeks earlier by the City board following a "rubbish season."

Syers was injured in the second match of the 2011–12 season, a 2–3 defeat against Leeds United in the League Cup; it was announced that he would be out of action for 10 to 12 weeks.

Doncaster Rovers
After his contract with Bradford expired, he signed a two-year deal with Doncaster Rovers on 14 June 2012. Syers said he was attracted by the ambition of Doncaster's manager, ex-Bradford player Dean Saunders, after the club made him "an offer I couldn't refuse." On the final day of the season, he helped Doncaster win the League One title with a 1–0 win against Brentford.

Scunthorpe United
He signed an initial one-month loan deal with Scunthorpe United on 5 October 2013. He was recalled by Doncaster on 3 January 2014.

In January 2014 he was linked with a return to former club Bradford City, though the club denied the speculation. Later that month he signed a permanent two-and-a-half-year contract with Scunthorpe. On 22 February 2014, Syers scored the first hat-trick of his career in a 5–1 home victory over Portsmouth. Syers was injured in the opening game of the 2014–15 season, and missed the rest of the campaign. He later stated that his time injured while with Bradford City was helping him with his latest injury.

Rochdale
After being released by Scunthorpe at the start of the month, Syers joined Rochdale on 18 January 2016, on a contract until the end of the season.

Later career
His contract with Rochdale was terminated in the summer of 2016, following which he rejoined Guiseley in August 2016.

He moved to Darlington in October 2016, and was a first-team regular for the next two years.

Syers left Darlington for Northern Premier League Premier Division club Farsley Celtic in late November 2018.

Cricket career
Syers played Bradford League cricket for Spen Victoria, Pudsey St Lawrence, Collingham and Farsley, as a wicket-keeper and batsman. In 2010, he scored 225 runs at an average of 75.00 in four innings to help Farsley reach the final of the Priestley Cup, but was unable to play because of his new professional football career.

Career statistics

References

1987 births
Living people
Footballers from Leeds
English footballers
Association football midfielders
Darlington F.C. players
Ossett Albion A.F.C. players
Harrogate Town A.F.C. players
Farsley Celtic A.F.C. players
Guiseley A.F.C. players
Bradford City A.F.C. players
Doncaster Rovers F.C. players
Scunthorpe United F.C. players
Rochdale A.F.C. players
English Football League players
National League (English football) players
Northern Premier League players